Itagi is a village in Karnataka, India. Itagi may also refer to
Itagi, Bahia, a municipality in North-Eastern Brazil
Madhuri Itagi, a Kannada actress and reality television personality